IV liga Łódź group (grupa łódzka) is one of the groups of IV liga, the 5th level of Polish football league system. 
The league was created in season 2000/2001 after introducing new administrative division of Poland. Until the end of the 2007/08 season IV liga was placed at 4th tier of league system but this was changed with the formation of the Ekstraklasa as the top-level league in Poland.
The clubs from Łódź Voivodeship compete in this group. The winner of the league is promoted to III liga group I. The bottom teams are relegated to the groups of Liga okręgowa from Łódź Voivodeship. These groups are Łódź, Piotrków Trybunalski, Sieradz and Skierniewice.

Season 2000/01 
IV liga is placed at 4th level of Polish football league system until the end of 2007/08 season.

Łódź group was created with the following 20 clubs:
 (R) relegated from III liga (Łódź-Katowice): GKS II Bełchatów and Start Łódź.
 moved from 'Kalisz-Łódź-Piotrków Tryb.-Sieradz' group: Bzura Ozorków, MKP Zgierz, Pogoń Zduńska Wola, Start Brzeziny, Stasiak Gomunice, Warta Działoszyn, Warta Sieradz, Widzew II Łódź, Włókniarz-Trzy Korony Pabianice and Woy Bukowiec Opoczyński.
 moved from 'Konin-Płock-Skierniewice-Włocławek' group: Górnik Łęczyca, Huragan Bobrowniki, Mazovia Rawa Mazowiecka and MKS Kutno.
 (P) promoted from Liga okręgowa: Stal Głowno (Łódź), Ceramika Paradyż (Piotrków Tryb.), Jutrzenka Warta (Sieradz) and Pogoń Rogów (Skierniewice).

Source: mogiel.net
 Huragan Bobrowniki withdrew in mid-season. Its results were cancelled.
 Woy Bukowiec Opoczyński eventually stayed in IV liga after the merge with newcomer Ceramika II Opoczno before start of the next season. Woy became legal successor of this merge.

Season 2001/02 
League reduced to 18 teams.
New clubs:
 (R) relegated from III liga "Łódź-Mazovia-Podlasie-Warmia/Masuria" group: WKS Wieluń and Włókniarz Konstantynów Łódzki.
 (P) promoted from Liga okręgowa: Sokół Aleksandrów Łódzki ("Łódź II" group), Victoria Szadek ("Sieradz" group) and Widok Skierniewice ("Skierniewice" group).

Source: http://www.90minut.pl/liga/0/liga54.html
 Ceramika II Opoczno promoted from "Piotrków Tryb." group merged with Woy Bukowiec Opoczyński to form Ceramika II/Woy Bukowiec Opoczyński. Woy became the legal successor of this merge.

Season 2002/03 
New clubs:
 (R) relegated from III liga "Łódź-Mazovia-Podlasie-Warmia/Masuria" group: LKS Gomunice.
 (P) promoted from Liga okręgowa: ŁKS II Łódź ("Łódź" group II),  RKS II Radomsko ("Piotrków Tryb." group), Ekolog Wojsławice ("Sieradz" group) and Mazovia Rawa Mazowiecka ("Skierniewice" group).

Source: http://www.90minut.pl/liga/0/liga387.html
 Mazovia Rawa Mazowiecka eventually stayed in IV liga after the merge with newcomer Białka Biała Rawska before start of the next season. Mazovia became legal successor of this merge.

Season 2003/04 

FINAL TABLE:

Season 2004/05 

FINAL TABLE:

Season 2005/06 

FINAL TABLE:

Season 2006/07 

FINAL TABLE:

Season 2007/08 

FINAL TABLE:

Season 2008/09 

FINAL TABLE:

Season 2009/10 

FINAL TABLE:

Season 2010/11 

FINAL TABLE:

Season 2011/12 

FINAL TABLE:

Season 2012/13 

FINAL TABLE:

Season 2013/14 

FINAL TABLE:

Season 2014/15 

FINAL TABLE:

Season 2015/16 

FINAL TABLE:

Season 2016/17 

FINAL TABLE:

Season 2017/18 

FINAL TABLE:

Season 2018/19 

FINAL TABLE:

Season 2019/20 

Final table (due to COVID-19 pandemic league was ended after 17th round):

Season 2020/21 

FINAL TABLE:
TBA

All-time table

Locations of the clubs 
Locations of all clubs playing in IV liga Łódź group:

References

Football leagues in Poland
Sport in Łódź Voivodeship